La Garriga is a municipality in the province of Barcelona and autonomous community of Catalonia, Spain.

Notable natives and residents
 The Catalan missionary priest in Cameroon Jordi Mas Castells was born here in 1930 and he died here in 2010. In 2008, the town council in La Garriga honoured him as Illustrious Citizen.
 The New York-based sculptor, Ester Partegàs, was born here in 1972.

References

Bibliography

External links 

 
 Government data pages 

Municipalities in Vallès Oriental